King Philip Regional School District is a school district headquartered in Norfolk, Massachusetts.

Its territory includes Norfolk, Plainville, and Wrentham.

Schools 
 King Philip Regional High School - Wrentham
King Philip Regional Middle School is a middle school drawing students in grades 7-8.  The school is located at 18 King Street, Norfolk.

References

External links
 King Philip Regional School District

School districts in Massachusetts
Education in Norfolk County, Massachusetts